The Peruvian Soccer Super Cup is a football competition organized by the Peruvian Football Federation since 2020. It is played in a single match, on a neutral field, which, if necessary, breaks the tie with shots from the penalty spot. Face the Bicentennial Cup champion with another team from the First Division contest. In the event that the same team wins both the cup and the championship, its rival will be the runner-up of the latter.

History 
The Peruvian Football Federation took control of the local domestic league from the Professional Football Sports Association, the tournament organizers, in 2019 and announced that the Peruvian first division tournament would be re-branded for 2019. With this re-branding, the tournament was expand from 16 to 18 teams and then to 20 in 2020. Also, The second division tournament was re-branded as Liga 2.

The Peruvian Football Federation also announced the creation of a new domestic cup tournament to be played once a year by both the first and second division teams, the winner of which would receive a berth to the Copa Sudamericana. The new domestic cup tournament was named Copa Bicentenario in honor of Peru's bicentennial. In 2020, the Peruvian Football Federation announced the creation of a super cup between the Copa Bicentenario champion and the Liga 1 champion to serve as a  "curtain-raiser" to the season. The name of the new tournament is Supercopa Peruana, Peruvian Super Cup, which is expected to be played in January of every year before the start of the regular season tournaments.

Binacional and Atlético Grau played the first edition of the new Super Cup tournament in 2020. Atlético Grau defeated Binacional by 3–0 to win the 3rd title in its history.

The only previous Super Cup tournament in Peru was the Copa Federación which was disputed by the Torneo Descentralizado (first division) champion and the Torneo Intermedio (domestic cup) champion in 2011.

Champions 
 Key
 CB = Winner of the Copa Bicentenario.
 PD = Winner of the respective Primera División.

Titles by club

Titles by region

External links 
 Peruvian Football League News

References

Football competitions in Peru